Vision NZ is a nationalist political party in New Zealand led by Hannah Tamaki, the co-leader of the fundamentalist Christian movement Destiny Church. The party was announced in May 2019. It contested the 2020 New Zealand general election both for electorate seats and the party list vote, receiving 0.1% of the party vote and winning no seats.

History

Earlier parties associated with the Tamakis 

Destiny Church was founded by Brian Tamaki in 1998 and is led by Brian and his wife Hannah Tamaki. Destiny New Zealand, a socially conservative Christian political party, was formed in 2003. The party contested the 2005 New Zealand general election; it received just over 14,000 party votes, or 0.62%, and won no seats. It was deregistered as a political party in 2007. The founder and former leader of the Destiny Party, Richard Lewis, created the Family Party in 2007. The Destiny Church supported the Family Party in the 2008 New Zealand general election. It won no seats and was deregistered in 2010.

Creation and registration 
On 23 May 2019, Hannah and Brian Tamaki announced the creation of a new party, at the time called Coalition New Zealand, with Hannah Tamaki to lead the party. She would not talk about policies at the announcement. Brian described the aim of the party to become a vehicle for the "silent majority" to express their beliefs. The party had not created a website, and in the days following the announcement, a number of other people registered relevant domain names and social media handles to stymie the party.

On 10 July 2019 the party applied to the Electoral Commission for registration. On 16 August the Electoral Commission refused registration on the grounds that the party's name and logo was likely to mislead voters. In October 2019, the party announced a new name, Vision NZ, and a new logo, and applied to the Electoral Commission for registration again. The registration was confirmed on 4 December.

The party received a broadcasting allocation of $51,821 for the 2020 election.

Relationship with other parties 
By December 2019, the leaders of both major parties, Labour and National, had ruled out working with Vision NZ. In July 2020 it rejected a merger offer from the New Zealand Public Party.

Dancing with the Stars and related events 
In February 2020, Hannah Tamaki was understood to be a contestant on the upcoming Dancing with the Stars television show. Later that month, media company MediaWorks New Zealand announced that while Tamaki was originally going to be on the show, it changed its mind and formally announced she was not to be in the show. A spokesperson said that "we have seen a very strong reaction, some of which has been extreme and concerning and MediaWorks does not condone bullying. We would be failing in our duty of care to everyone if we continued as planned."

After a TV presenter commented on Tamaki's inclusion in Dancing with the Stars, Vision NZ's campaign manager Jevan Goulter made a post on Facebook about the presenter. The post breached Facebook's community guidelines, media site Stuff declined to publish them, and  police were assessing a complaint laid about the post. Tamaki fired Goulter for these comments. Tamaki was asked by a journalist about similar comments by her husband Brian, who referred to "venomous, dirty liberal left, sexually confused antichrists", but Mrs Tamaki said she was not responsible for her husband's comments as they are not related to Vision NZ.

2020 election campaign 
Vision submitted a party list of five people for the 2020 general election, tied for the shortest list with the Heartland Party. All five also contested electorates, including Hannah Tamaki in the electorate of Waiariki.

By the end of September 2020, Vision NZ had only registered in one Colmar Brunton poll, receiving 0.1% of support in its May 2020 poll. In all other polls it had not registered any support. An electorate poll for the Waiariki seat conducted towards the end of September 2020 showed that Vision NZ's leader, Hannah Tamaki, was only polling at 2%, compared to her fellow candidates Tāmati Coffey (38%) and Rawiri Waititi (26%).

Vision New Zealand received 4,236 party votes at the 2020 election, or 0.1%. Hannah Tamaki secured 1,171 electorate votes in Waiariki (4% of the electorate vote), coming third behind the Māori Party's Rawiri Waititi and Labour's Tāmati Coffey. The party won no seats, but Hannah Tamaki claimed after the election that her goal had always been to unseat Labour's candidate Coffey from the Waiariki electorate, and since that seat was won by Waititi, the party had achieved that goal.

Policies 
Vision NZ has been described as a Christian party and a "Destiny Church-derived party", but Hannah Tamaki insists that Vision NZ is not a Christian party, saying that "people don't have to go to church to be members of Vision New Zealand, they don't have to go to church to vote for Vision New Zealand."

Vision opposes both abortion and homosexuality. Hannah Tamaki says that being gay is "wrong", though when discussing her opposition to gay MP Tāmati Coffey she said "If you do the work, I don’t care what you do, it’s your private life. I choose to live my Christian faith, and I don’t force that on anybody else." Brian Tamaki has said that homosexuality is a sin and has maintained there is a link between homosexuality and natural disasters.

Hannah Tamaki has called for a ban on the construction of new mosques. The party opposes immigration and has promised to ban all immigration and refugees for two years, although Tamaki backtracked on this, saying there would not be a total ban on refugees. It also seeks to remove the right of permanent residents to vote.

Vision supports greater financial autonomy for Māori people, including a Māori-owned bank and Tūhoe ownership of Te Urewera. Vision has called for government funding for Destiny Church programmes.

See also

Christian politics in New Zealand

References

External links

Political parties established in 2019
2019 establishments in New Zealand
Anti-abortion organisations in New Zealand
Christian political parties in New Zealand
Social conservative parties